Gosan Seowon may refer to 
Gosan Seowon, Andong
Gosan Seowon, Yeocheon
Gosan Seowon, Uljin
Gosan Seowon, Daegu
Gosan Seowon, Yeoju